Karimabad (also Romanized as Karīmābād) is a village in Rigestan Rural District, Zavareh District, Ardestan County, Isfahan Province, Iran. At the 2006 census, its population was 93, in 29 families.

References 

Populated places in Ardestan County